was a Japanese poet and musician of the early Heian period. His name is recorded in the Ogura Hyakunin Isshu, but there are no historical accounts of his pedigree. Some accounts say he was a son of Uda Tennō, Prince Atsumi, or that he was the fourth son of Daigo Tennō. There are also claims that he lived during the reign of Ninmyō Tennō.

Semimaru was a blind lute player who lived alone in a straw hut in Ausaka, which means "meeting slope".  "Ausaka is a slope about five miles east of the center of modern Kyoto.  Its apex is a narrow pass through the eastern range of mountains separating Kyoto from the area of Lake Biwa."  The emperor established a formal check point barrier, Ausaka no seki, at this summit in 646.  Today the place is known as Osaka.  A Shinto shrine was built there by the tenth century and eventually became known as Semimaru jinja.

Supposedly, on seeing the traffic on the road to the capital, he composed the following 

The above waka appears in the imperial anthology Gosen Wakashū. Other Semimaru poems appear in the anthologies Shin Kokin Wakashū, Kokin Wakashū and Shokukokin Wakashū.

According to the Konjaku Monogatarishū (Book 24, tale 23), for three years Minamoto no Hiromasa travelled from the capital regularly, hoping to hear and meet Semimaru.

Legacy
In nō there is a Zeami Motokiyo play, Semimaru, that depicts the life of a "young man, blind from birth...abandoned on a mountainside by his father", and his sister, "a beautiful young woman" that "suffers episodes of inexplicable madness which compel her to wander the countryside aimlessly."

Chikamatsu Monzaemon wrote the Joruri Semimaru.

Landmarks
A stone grave bearing the name of Semimaru in Miyazaki Village, Fukui Prefecture.

References 

This article is based on material from the equivalent article from the Japanese Wikipedia.

Japanese poets
People of Heian-period Japan
Beggars
Hyakunin Isshu poets
Deified Japanese people